FXYD6 (pronounced fix-id six), or FXYD domain-containing ion transport regulator 6, is a gene which is located at the 11q23.3 (chromosome 11 locus 23.3).  The FXYD6 protein contains 95 amino acids, and can be found in all human tissues except blood.

This gene belongs to the FXYD family of ion transport regulators

Pathology
According to recent research, mutations in the FXYD6 gene, or in sequences close by this gene, can predispose to the schizophrenia which is known to be strongly heritable.

References

External links 
GeneCards page about the gene

Genes on human chromosome 11
Transmembrane proteins